Universal Syncopations II is an album by Czech bassist Miroslav Vitouš recorded in 2004-05 and released on the ECM label.

Reception 
The Allmusic review by Alex Henderson awarded the album 3 stars, stating, "The interesting thing is that while Universal Syncopations 2 stresses ensemble playing and team work, parts of the album are quite free; this disc offers an inside/outside perspective, sometimes moving into mildly avant-garde territory but never favoring outright chaos. A quintessentially ECM aesthetic is very much at work on this solid effort, which will be enthusiastically welcomed by those who complain that Vitouš hasn't recorded often enough as a leader".

Track listing 
All compositions by Miroslav Vitouš
 "Opera" - 11:16 
 "Breakthrough" - 5:32 
 "The Prayer" - 7:06 
 "Solar Giant" - 4:42
 "Mediterranean Love" - 5:09 
 "Gmoong" - 6:13 
 "Universal Evolution" - 9:04 
 "Moment" - 2:58

Personnel 
 Miroslav Vitouš — double bass, meditation bowl
 Randy Brecker — trumpet (tracks 1 & 6)
 Gary Campbell — soprano saxophone, tenor saxophone (tracks 1-5 & 7)
 Bob Mintzer — tenor saxophone, bass clarinet (tracks 1, 6 & 7)
 Bob Malach — tenor saxophone (track 8)
 Daniele di Bonaventura — bandoneon (track 5)
 Adam Nussbaum — drums (track 1)
 Gerald Cleaver — drums (tracks 2-5 & 7)
 Vesna Vasko-Caceres — voice (track 8)
 Unnamed choir and orchestra

References 

ECM Records albums
Miroslav Vitouš albums
2007 albums
Albums produced by Manfred Eicher